The Deb is a musical by Hannah Reilly with music by Megan Washington and lyrics by Washington & Reilly.

Premise 
The Deb concerns high school outcast Taylah, her feminist inner-city cousin Maeve and the annual debutante ball in the fictional drought-stricken country town Dunburn. Reilly describes it as "a love letter to awkward teenage adolescence and learning how to celebrate what makes you unique”.

Production 
The original Australian Theatre for Young People production was staged from 8 April to 22 May 2022 at ATYP's The Rebel Theatre in Sydney's Walsh Bay. It was co-directed by Reilly and Fraser Corfield with choreographer Sally Dashwood and music director Zara Stanton. The cast included Katelin Koprivec (Taylah), Charlotte MacInnes (Maeve), Jay Laga’aia and Tara Morice.

Reception 
The Deb was positively received. The Guardian called it "an embrace and expansion of new trends in Australian musical comedy" and a "a celebration of a new joyful onstage movement of women-centred, lovingly local stories with big laughs and big pop choruses". The Sydney Morning Herald noted "fine original music – from ballads, hip hop, country, and rap – with witty lyrics".

Film adaptation 
The musical is reportedly in development as a feature film with Rebel Wilson’s company Camp Sugar Productions.

References 

2022 musicals
Australian musicals
Original musicals